The Americas Zone was one of the three zones of the regional Davis Cup competition in 2000.

In the Americas Zone there were four different tiers, called groups, in which teams competed against each other to advance to the upper tier. The top two teams in Group III advanced to the Americas Zone Group II in 2001, whereas the bottom two teams were relegated to the Americas Zone Group IV in 2001.

Participating nations

Draw
 Venue: Liguanea Club, Kingston, Jamaica
 Date: 22–26 March

Group A

Group B

1st to 4th place play-offs

5th to 8th place play-offs

Final standings

  and  promoted to Group II in 2001.
  and  relegated to Group IV in 2001.

Round robin

Group A

Haiti vs. Puerto Rico

Panama vs. Jamaica

Haiti vs. Panama

Puerto Rico vs. Jamaica

Haiti vs. Jamaica

Puerto Rico vs. Panama

Group B

Netherlands Antilles vs. Bolivia

Dominican Republic vs. Trinidad and Tobago

Netherlands Antilles vs. Trinidad and Tobago

Dominican Republic vs. Bolivia

Netherlands Antilles vs. Dominican Republic

Bolivia vs. Trinidad and Tobago

1st to 4th place play-offs

Semifinals

Puerto Rico vs. Dominican Republic

Jamaica vs. Netherlands Antilles

Final

Dominican Republic vs. Netherlands Antilles

3rd to 4th play-off

Puerto Rico vs. Jamaica

5th to 8th place play-offs

5th to 8th play-offs

Panama vs. Trinidad and Tobago

Haiti vs. Bolivia

5th to 6th play-off

Trinidad and Tobago vs. Bolivia

7th to 8th play-off

Panama vs. Haiti

References

External links
Davis Cup official website

Davis Cup Americas Zone
Americas Zone Group III